Moreno, California may refer to:
 Moreno, Riverside County, California
 Moreno, San Diego County, California
 Moreno Valley, California

See also
 Moreno